Jamie is a unisex name. It is a diminutive form of James or, more rarely, other names. It is also given as a name in its own right.

People

Female
 Jamie Anne Allman (born 1977), American actress
 Jamie Babbit (born 1970), American film and television director
 Jamie Belsito (born 1973), American politician
 Jamie Bernadette, American actress and occasional producer
 Jamie Bochert (born 1978), American fashion model and musician
 Jamie Brewer, American actress and model
 Jamie Broumas (born 1959), American jazz singer
 Jamie Chadwick (born 1998), British racing driver
 Jamie Chung (born 1983), American actress
 Jamie Clayton (born 1978), American actress and model
 Jamie Lee Curtis (born 1958), American actress and author
 Jamie Dantzscher (born 1982), American artistic gymnast
 Jamie Finn (born 1998, Irish footballer
 Jamie Gauthier, American Democratic politician
 Jamie Ginn (born 1982), American beauty queen
 Jamie Gorelick (born 1950), American lawyer
 Jamie Grace (born 1991), American rapper, singer, and songwriter
 Jamie Greubel (born 1983), American bobsledder
 Jamie Hampton (born 1990), American tennis player
 Jamie Hayter (born 1995), English professional wrestler
 Jamie Herrell (born 1994), American-born Filipino beauty queen
 Jamie Hooyman (born 1963), American academic
 Jamie Howe (born 1984), American auto racing reporter
 Jamie Gray Hyder (born 1985), American actress and model
 Jamie-Lee Kriewitz (born 1998), German singer
 Jamie Kern Lima (born 1977), American entrepreneur
 Jamie Loeb (born 1995), American tennis player
 Jamie Luner (born 1971), American actress
 Jamie Marchi (born 1977), American voice actress
 Jamie Margolin (born 2001), American climate change activist
 Jamie McCourt (born 1953), American ambassador and attorney
 Jamie McDell (born 1992), New Zealand singer and songwriter
 Jamie McLeod-Skinner (born 1967), American attorney, engineer, and politician
 Jamie Ray Newman (born 1978), American actress
 Jamie O'Neal (born 1968), Australian country singer
 Jamie Rivera (born 1966), Filipino singer
 Jamie Rose (born 1959), American actress
 Jamie Pineda (born 1988), American model, singer, and songwriter
 Jamie Salé (born 1977), Canadian figure skater
 Jamie-Lynn Sigler (born 1981), American actress
 Jamie Silverstein (born 1983), American figure skater and ice dancer
 Jamie Sinclair (born 1992), American-born Canadian curler
 Jamie Renée Smith (born 1987), American actress
 Jamie Lynn Spears (born 1991), American actress and singer
 Jamie Tisch (born 1968), American businesswoman and philanthropist
 Jamie Yeung (born 1997), Hong Kong competitive swimmer

Male

A–E
 Jamie Adams (born 1987), Scottish footballer
 Jamie Allen (disambiguation)
 Jamie Anderson (disambiguation)
 Jamie Arnold (baseball) (born 1974), American baseball pitcher
 Jamie Arnold (basketball) (born 1975), American-Israeli basketball player
 Jamie Baillie (born 1966), Canadian politician and CEO of Credit Union Atlantic
 Jamie Bamber (born 1973), English actor
 Jamie Bartlett (1966–2022), English-born South African actor
 Jamie Bates (born 1989), English welterweight kickboxer 
 Jamie Bates (footballer) (born 1968), English footballer
 Jamie Baulch (born 1973), British sprinter and television presenter
 Jamie Bell (born 1986), English actor
 Jamie Benn (born 1989), Canadian ice hockey player
 Jamie Bennett (disambiguation)
 Jamie Bond, Australian rules footballer 
 Jamie Boreham (born 1978), Canadian football player
 Jamie Brennan (born  1996/7), Irish footballer
 Jamie Briggs (born 1977), Australian politician
 Jamie Brooks (born 1983), English football player
 Jamie Brown (disambiguation)
 Jamie Buhrer (born 1989), Australian rugby player
 Jamie Carragher (born 1978), English footballer
 Jamie Coleman (born 1975), American football player 
 Jamie Cook (born 1985), guitarist for British band Arctic Monkeys
 Jamie Cope (born 1985), English snooker player
 Jamie Crombie (born 1965), American-Canadian squash player
 Jamie Cullum (born 1979), English pianist, singer, and songwriter
 Jamie DeWolf (born 1977), American slam poet
 Jamie Dimon (born 1956), CEO and chairman of J.P. Morgan Chase and Co.
 Jamie Dornan (born 1982), Northern Irish model, actor and musician
 Jamie Draven (born 1979), English actor
 Jamie Drysdale (born 2002), Canadian ice hockey player
 Jamie Durie (born 1970), Australian landscaper and television personality

F–N
 Jamie Farr (born 1934), American actor
 Jamie Foreman (born 1958), British actor
 Jamie Foxx (born 1967), American actor and musician
 Jamie Gillan (born 1997), American football player
 Jamie Gillis (1943–2010), American porn star
 Jamie Gold (born 1969), American television producer and poker player
 Jamie Gonoud (born 1992/1993), Westmeath Gaelic footballer
 Jaymie Graham (born 1983), Australian rules footballer
 Jamie Harris (actor) (born 1963), British actor
 Jamie Harris (footballer) (born 1979), Welsh footballer
 Jamie Hendry (born 1985), British theatre producer
 Jamie Hewlett (born 1968), comic book artist and co-creator of the band Gorillaz
 Jamie Hyneman (born 1956), American television host
 Jamie Iannone, American businessman, CEO of eBay
 Jamie Johnston (born 1989), Canadian actor
 Jamie Kennedy (born 1970), American comedian and actor
 Jamie Kennedy (chef), Canadian chef
 Jamie King (born 1972), British television actor
 Jamie Korab (born 1979), Canadian curler
 Jamie Langenbrunner (born 1975), American hockey player
 Jamie Lee (disambiguation)
 Jamie Lewis (born 1991), Welsh darts player
 Jamie Lidell (born 1973), English musician
 Jamie Lyon (born 1982), Australian rugby player
 Jamie Malonzo (born 1996), Filipino-American basketball player
 Jamie Masters (born 1955), Canadian ice hockey player
 Jamie McGonnigal (born 1975), American voice actor
 Jamie McMurray (born 1976), American NASCAR driver
 Jamie McNeair (born 1969), American heptathlete
 Jamie Meder (born 1991), American football player
 Jamie Moore (boxer) (born 1978), English boxer
 Jamie Moore (jockey) (born 1985), English jockey
 Jamie Moyer (born 1962), baseball player
 Jamie Murray (born 1986), Scottish tennis player
 Jamie Muscato (born 1990), English actor and singer
 Jamie Newman (born 1997), American football player

O–Z
 Jamie O'Hara (disambiguation)
 Jamie O'Neill (born 1962), Irish novelist
 Jamie Oldaker (1951–2020), American drummer
 Jamie Oliver (born 1975), TV chef
 Jamie Oliver (musician) (born 1975), member of lostprophets
 Jamie Parker (born 1979), English actor
 Jamie Raines (born 1994), English transgender YouTuber and LGBT advocate
 Jamie Redknapp (born 1973), English footballer
 Jamie Reid (born 1947), English anarchist artist
 Jamie Roberts (born 1986), Welsh rugby player
 Jamie Scott (born 1984), English singer-songwriter and producer
 Jamie Smith (disambiguation)
 Jamie Soward (born 1984), Australian rugby player
 Jamie Spencer (born 1980), Irish jockey
 Jamie T (born 1986), stage name of English musician Jamie Treays
 Jamie Theakston (born 1970), English television and radio presenter
 Jamie Thomas (born 1974), American skateboarder
 Jamie Travis (born 1979), Canadian filmmaker
 Jamie Vardy (born 1987), English footballer
 Jamie Waite (born 1986), Thai footballer
 Jamie Walker (disambiguation)
 Jamie Walsh, English rugby player
 Jamie Whincup (born 1983), Australian racing driver
 Jamie Wilkinson, founder of Know Your Meme
 Jamie Wong, Hong Kong cyclist

Fictional characters 
 Jamie (Hollyoaks), in the soap opera Hollyoaks
 Jamie (Malcolm in the Middle), in the TV series Malcolm in the Middle
 Jamie, a NPC (Non Player Character) in Hypixel's MMORPG gamemode, Skyblock
 Jamie, the title character of Jamie (TV series), a 1953/1954 American sitcom
 Jamie Clapton, in the soap opera Doctors
 Jamie Dutton, a main character in the Paramount Network original television series Yellowstone.
 Jamie Fraser, a main character from the tv series Outlander
 Jamie Grimm, a main character in the book series I Funny
 Jamie Jolina, a The Sims 3 character
 Jamie Kane, a UK pop star of an alternate reality game of the same name
 Ja'mie King, an Australian schoolgirl played by Chris Lilley in various Australian TV series
 Jamie Lawson, character in Small Wonder, played by Jerry Supiran
 Jamie Lloyd, in the Halloween film series
 Jamie Madrox, a Marvel superhero, also known as Multiple Man
 Jamie McCrimmon, in Doctor Who, played by Frazer Hines
 Jamie Powell, a character in the American sitcom television series Charles in Charge played by Nicole Eggert
 Jamie Sullivan, a character in the 2002 American coming-of-age romantic drama movie A Walk to Remember
 Jamie Taylor, a main character in the drama-gothic romance series “The Haunting of Bly Manor” played by Amelia Eve
 Jamie Tyler, an American boy with mind control powers from Anthony Horowitz's Power of Five series

See also 
 
 Jaime, Spanish/Portuguese variant
 Jaimie (disambiguation)
 Jamy (disambiguation)
 Jay (given name)
 Jayme, a given name and a surname
 Jaymee Joaquin (born 1984), Filipina actress

References 

English-language unisex given names
English unisex given names
Unisex given names
English-language masculine given names
English-language feminine given names
English masculine given names
English feminine given names
Masculine given names
Feminine given names
French unisex given names
Hypocorisms